The Prva A liga 2011–12 basketball team regular season started October 2011.

The Opportunity Liga (in English: Opportunity League) is a national professional basketball league in Montenegro. It is the top basketball division in Montenegro's Košarkaški savez Crne Gore (KSCG) national basketball federation. It was established in the year 2006, shortly after Montenegro declared its independence from Serbia and Montenegro.  The league is sponsored by Opportunity Bank.

Teams 
KK Budućnost - Podgorica
KK Danilovgrad - Danilovgrad
KK Teodo - Tivat
KK Lovćen - Cetinje
KK Mogren - Budva
KK Mornar - Bar
KK Ulcinj - Ulcinj
KK ABS Primorje - Herceg Novi
KK Jedinstvo - Bijelo Polje
KK Podgorica - Podgorica
KK Sutjeska - Nikšić

Regular season

External links 
 Prva A liga

Prva A liga seasons
League
Monte